Olúfẹ́mi O. Táíwò (born 1989/1990) is an American philosopher and professor of philosophy at Georgetown University. Grist.org described him as "one of America’s most prominent philosophers".

Education and career
Táíwò earned his BA in philosophy from Indiana University and his PhD in philosophy from the University of California, Los Angeles. His theoretical work is heavily influenced by the Black radical tradition, contemporary philosophy of language, materialist thought, social science, German transcendental philosophy, activist histories, and activist thinkers. His most recent book Elite Capture examines how elites have appropriated radical critiques of racial capitalism to further their own agendas.

Books

Further reading
 . "Elite Capture: How the Powerful Took Over Identity Politics". 18 January 2023 On Democracy Now!.
  "Constructing Solidarity: An Interview with Olúfẹ́mi O. Táíwò". 22 April 2022. Ritika Ramamurthy, Nonprofit Quarterly.

External links 

 Personal website
 Twitter page

References

Georgetown University faculty
American philosophers

Living people

20th-century births
Year of birth uncertain